The Short S.16 Scion  and Scion II were 1930s British two-engine, cantilever monoplanes built by Short Brothers and (under licence) by Pobjoy Airmotors and Aircraft Ltd. in Rochester, Kent between 1933 and 1937. Altogether 22 Scion/Scion II aircraft were built and they provided useful service to operators working from small airstrips/water courses in many parts of the globe, including Europe, the Near and Middle East, Sierra Leone, Papua New Guinea and Australia. Many were impressed into the Royal Air Force during the Second World War, providing pilot ferry services, anti-aircraft co-operation and radar calibration duties. Of the civilian Scions, at least two were still operating in Australia in 1966, one having been re-engined with de Havilland Gipsy Minor engines.

Design

The tail unit comprised a cantilever tailplane with a single fin and rudder. The prototype aircraft was powered by two  Pobjoy R radial engines; the production aircraft however were fitted with the  Pobjoy Niagara III radial engines. The engines in the Scion were mounted with thrust-lines below the chord-line of the wings; in the Scion II they were raised so that the thrust-lines were aligned with the chord-line, to avoid trim changes in pitch with changes in power. Both the Scion and the Scion II were produced as either landplanes or floatplanes, the majority as landplanes (see the table below). On the landplanes the landing gear comprised a single wheel on each side of the fuselage, mounted on a vertical coil-spring and oleo leg inboard of the engine; there was a small castoring tailwheel mounted below the rear end of the fuselage.

History

The Scion was developed as a light transport for 5–6 passengers. The first flight of the prototype aircraft (G-ACJI) took place on 18 August 1933, piloted by Shorts' Chief Test Pilot John Lankester Parker. The first production aircraft (G-ACUV) was flown at the SBAC's airshow at Hendon in 1934. In 1935 the fifth production model was built as the revised model Scion II; the major improvement was the repositioning of the two engines as noted above; other changes included the provision of 6 passenger seats as standard (on the original Scion there was a folding seat for a sixth passenger if needed), an improved windscreen and better cabin windows. During the production of the Scions the company had opened a new factory at Rochester Airport and all Scion IIs were manufactured there, initially by Shorts, later by Pobjoy, first under licence and later under Shorts' ownership.

G-ADDR, the fifth Scion II, was retained by Shorts as an experimental testbed aircraft, and it was on this aircraft (temporarily designated M.3) that a scale wooden model of the slender wings (with Gouge flaps) for the later Short Empire boats was tested, the first flight in this configuration being conducted by Lankester Parker on 6 August 1935. With these flaps fitted it was tested at the Royal Aircraft Establishment, which found that the Gouge flap decreased distance to take-off and stalling speed, among other improvements. Further work with standard wings was carried out; one flight from Rochester Airport, with experimental full-span flaps incorporating retractable spoilers instead of ailerons, was made on 22 July 1936; this idea proved unworkable, Lankester Parker having to draw on his considerable experience to coax the aircraft around on a single circuit before landing safely. The standard wing was refitted and the aircraft continued with Shorts in this configuration until it was impressed into military service in 1940, an operational usage experienced by 14 of the 22 Scion/Scion II aircraft.

G-AEZF, built by Pobjoy and first flown in December 1937, was originally operated as a floatplane by Elders Colonial Airways in Sierra Leone, between Bathurst (Gambia) and Freetown, and was returned to Shorts in 1939 and converted into a landplane in 1941. After operating for the company for another six years it was eventually sold on to Air Couriers Ltd. in 1947, after which it changed hands between private owners several times before finally ending up at Southend airport.

A larger 9-passenger enlarged version of Scion was produced as the Short S.22 Scion Senior.

Survivors
G-AEZFAfter a long career, this aircraft stood derelict at Southend Airport. Its frame was rescued and is currently held for long-term restoration by the Medway Aircraft Preservation Society at Rochester Airport.

G-ACUX one of the 'Australian' Scions still flying in the 1960s, was later returned to the United Kingdom and is held in deep storage at the Ulster Folk and Transport Museum, Cultra, Holywood, Northern Ireland. It is claimed that its condition has been allowed to deteriorate. It was not on public display in April 2012.

VH-UTV another 'Australian' Scion. Under restoration at Luskintyre in New South Wales to return to operable condition. Privately owned.

Variants
 S-16 Scion : Company designation.
 Scion : Light transport aircraft, powered by two  Pobjoy Niagara I or II piston engines. Five built, one prototype and four production machines.
 Scion II : Light transport aircraft, powered by two  Pobjoy Niagara III piston engines.
 M.3: Scion II fitted with scaled-down Empire flying-boat wings with Gouge flaps

Scion and Scion II production

Operators
Floatplanes

Papuan Concessions Ltd (VH-UUP the former G-ACUX)

Elders Colonial Airways Ltd (Bathurst-Freetown) (G-AEZF)

Landplanes

Arabian Airlines Ltd

Adelaide Airways Ltd (VH-UTV & VH-UUT)
Marshall Airways Ltd (VH-UUP)

Palestine Airways Ltd (Haifa-Lydda)

Elders Colonial Airways Ltd

Aberdeen Airways
Air Couriers Ltd
Airwork Ltd
Atlantic Coast Air Services Ltd
Golden Eagle Marine & Air
Great Western & Southern Air Lines Ltd
Lundy and Atlantic Coast Air Lines Ltd
Nottingham Airport Ltd
Olley Air Services Ltd
Palestine Airways Ltd
Pobjoy Airmotors and Aircraft Ltd
Ramsgate Airport Ltd
Royal Air Force
No. 173 Squadron RAF
Short Brothers Ltd
Southend-on-Sea Flying Services Ltd
Southern Airways Ltd
West of Scotland Air Services Ltd (Renfrew-Mull)
Williams & Co., Squires Gate, Blackpool
Yorkshire Airways Ltd

Specifications (Scion II landplane)

See also

References

Bibliography

 Green, William. Flying Boats Vol.5 (Warplanes of the Second World War). London: Macdonald & Co., 1962.
 
 The Illustrated Encyclopedia of Aircraft (part: 1982–1985). London: Orbis Publishing.
 
 Jackson, A.J. British Civil Aircraft since 1919. London: Putnam & Sons, Ltd., 1974. .

External links

 Short Scion – British Aircraft Directory
 Short Scion – British Aircraft of World War II
 "FLIGHT advertisement for SCION." FLIGHT, 11 April 1935, p. 143.

1930s British airliners
Short Brothers aircraft
High-wing aircraft
Aircraft first flown in 1933
Twin piston-engined tractor aircraft